is a Japanese professional wrestler currently working as a freelancer. Nishimura formerly worked for New Japan Pro-Wrestling (NJPW) and MUGA World Pro Wrestling (MUGA).

Professional wrestling career

Early years (1991–1998)
Nishimura debuted for New Japan Pro-Wrestling (NJPW) in April 1991 after training in their Dojo by Joe Daigo and Tony St. Clair. In 1994, he embarked on a tour of the United States, entering the Global Wrestling Federation in Dallas, Texas, winning its Light Heavyweight Championship on August 26, and eventually becoming the promotion's final champion. A day later, Nishimura was one of eight men chosen to take part in a tournament for the vacant NWA World Heavyweight Championship. In the infamous tournament promoted by Eastern Championship Wrestling (which featured winner Shane Douglas throwing the belt down after winning it), Nishimura was eliminated in the first round by Dean Malenko. In a second tournament hosted by Smoky Mountain Wrestling in November, Nishimura battled Lou Perez to a draw and both men were eliminated. Nishimura returned to Japan when his mentor Tatsumi Fujinami was forming an offshoot promotion called MUGA (Selflessness), which would base its style around traditional catch-as-catch-can wrestling. Nevertheless, the promotion did not catch on and Nishimura left the country once again, targeting Otto Wanz's Catch Wrestling Association, touring throughout Austria and Germany, eventually winning its Submission Shootfighting Championship.

New Japan Pro-Wrestling (1998–2006)
He returned to New Japan in 1998 and teamed with Shinya Hashimoto in the struggle against NWO Japan's Keiji Mutoh and Masahiro Chono, who held the IWGP Tag Team Championship, but they were unsuccessful. Nishimura also failed to unseat IWGP Heavyweight Champion Kensuke Sasaki, and Nishimura was diagnosed with cancer later in the year.  Nishimura was inactive until the cancer went into remission in 2000, following treatment.  In 2001, he went to the United States again to polish his skills at the Funking Conservatory in Florida, under the eye of Dory Funk, Jr. (whom Nishimura admired from watching matches of New Japan's founder Antonio Inoki). He blossomed again, winning the FC's United States Championship. After returning to Japan, Nishimura's star was bright enough to warrant an earnest push, and he won the IWGP tag team titles with Fujinami. Nonetheless, the bi-promotional duo of Mutoh and All Japan Pro Wrestling's Taiyō Kea were on the rise, and the two teams clashed over both the IWGP title and AJPW's World Tag Team Championship, both of which ended up around the waists of Mutoh and Kea.

In 2002 he teamed with Manabu Nakanishi under the name Gotch-ism, but they failed to win the titles. As Nakanishi began teaming more with Yutaka Yoshie, Nishimura engaged in a feud with the returning Minoru Suzuki, with whom he had a MUGA-style feud that showcased the traditional, scientific skills of both wrestlers. He later began teaming with Hiroyoshi Tenzan, with whom he won another IWGP tag team title in late 2003. They held the belts until February 2004 when they were defeated by Suzuki and Yoshihiro Takayama. As Tenzan focused on the IWGP Heavyweight title, Nishimura aimlessly was relegated to the mid-card. In January 2006, Nishimura opted not to renew his NJPW contract and left the company altogether. In February, he and old MUGA comrade Katsushi Takemura took part in American promotion Chikara's 2006 Tag World Grand Prix, where they made it to the semi-finals, before being defeated by Milano Collection A. T. and Skayde. He also participated in the NWA Reclaiming the Glory tournament, where he attempted to win the NWA World title for a third time, but was defeated in the first round by Brent Albright on Saturday, June 2, 2007.

All Japan Pro Wrestling (2007–2021)
On October 20, 2007, Nishimura announced that he and trainee Manabu Soya have signed with All Japan Pro Wrestling (AJPW) as full-time wrestlers, citing unhappiness with the erratic MUGA World scheduling. From November 23 to December 9, 2007, Nishimura teamed with Masanobu Fuchi to compete in the World's Strongest Tag Determination League, finishing the league with 7 points (2 wins, 2 losses and 3 draws) and placing 5th overall. In November 2007, Nishimura announced plans to form a tag team with Dory Funk, Jr. in 2008, along with claiming that All Japan is planning a retirement ceremony for Funk.

Wrestling New Classic (2013)
On March 31, 2013, Nishimura made his debut for Wrestling New Classic (WNC), defeating Zeus to become the number one contender to the WNC Championship. On April 25, he defeated Akira to become the second WNC Champion. A month later, Nishimura joined Akira's villainous Synapse stable. On August 8, Nishimura lost the WNC Championship to Tajiri in his first defense.

Championships and accomplishments 
Catch Wrestling Association
CWA Submission Shootfighting Championship (1 time, inaugural)

Funking Conservatory
!Bang! TV World Heavyweight Championship (1 time, current)
FC United States Heavyweight Championship (1 time)

Global Wrestling Federation
GWF Light Heavyweight Championship (1 time)

Independent Wrestling World
IWW One Night Tournament (1998)

New Japan Pro-Wrestling
IWGP Tag Team Championship (2 times) – with Tatsumi Fujinami (1) and Hiroyoshi Tenzan (1)
The Catch of Lancashire Tournament (1996)
G1 Tag League (2003) – with Hiroyoshi Tenzan
Triathlon Survivor (2002) – with Manabu Nakanishi & Yutaka Yoshie
Tag Team Best Bout (2002) with Manabu Nakanishi vs. Hiroyoshi Tenzan and Masahiro Chono on June 5
Technique Award (2001, 2002, 2003)

Nikkan Sports
Technique Award (2001, 2002, 2003)

New Korea Pro-Wrestling Association
NKPWA World Heavyweight Champion (3 times, current)

Pro Wrestling Illustrated
PWI ranked him #213 of the top 500 singles wrestlers in the PWI 500 in 2010

Wrestling New Classic
WNC Championship (1 time)

References

External links 
Official Blog
Profile at Strong Style Spirit
Profile at Puroresu Central
 

Japanese male professional wrestlers
1971 births
Living people
Japanese sportsperson-politicians
20th-century professional wrestlers
21st-century professional wrestlers
IWGP Heavyweight Tag Team Champions
GWF Light Heavyweight Champions